Fengcheng is a town in northeastern Fujian province, People's Republic of China, located along the Taiwan Strait coast in Lianjiang County, of which it is the county seat. The name of the town literally means, "Phoenix City."

See also 
 List of township-level divisions of Fujian

References 

Township-level divisions of Fujian
Lianjiang County
Towns in Fujian